Venice At Dawn is a 2022 British romantic drama film written and directed by Jamie Adams, starring Greta Bellamacina, Fabien Frankel and Tanya Burr.

Venice At Dawn had its world premiere at the Everyman Cinema in Broadgate, London on 30 August 2022, and is set to be released in the United Kingdom on 10 December 2023 by Amazon Prime.

Synopsis
The plot follows two unlikely thieves, Dixon (Frankel) and Sally (Bellamacina), who after meeting drunkenly in a bar plot to steal an expensive painting from Sally's ex-boyfriend Stephen (Tom Basden).

Cast

Production
Principal photography finished in London in February 2020, with some filming taking place at The Troubadour. The film has been said to be made in an improvisational style that Adams also deployed on previous pictures such as Black Mountain Poets and Love Spreads.

Release

Venice At Dawn had its world premiere at the Everyman Cinema in Broadgate, London on 30 August 2022, and is set to have a wide release in the United Kingdom on 10 December 2023 by Amazon Prime.

References

External links
 

2020s British films
2020s English-language films
2022 romantic drama films
British romantic drama films
Films directed by Jamie Adams
Films shot in London